The Diocese of Funchal was created originally on 12 June 1514, by bull Pro excellenti præeminentia of Pope Leo X, following the elevation of Funchal from a village to the status of city, by King Manuel I of Portugal (Royal Decree of 21 August 1508). The new diocese was a suffragan of the Archdiocese of Lisbon.

Before the issuance of the papal bull, between 1433 and 1514 the civil and religious administrations were in charge of the Grand-Master of the Order of Christ. In fact all Portuguese Atlantic territories were under the jurisdiction of Order of Christ, until the situation changed in 1514 with the creation of the Diocese.

Once the diocese was created, the bishop of Funchal had jurisdiction over the entire area occupied by the Portuguese in the Atlantic and Indian Oceans. Thus, the Diocese comprised not only the Islands of Madeira, but all the territories discovered or to be discovered by the Portuguese. Thus, its jurisdiction extended throughout the western and eastern African territory, Brazil and Asia. Given its jurisdiction extent, the diocese's first bishop, D. Diogo Pinheiro used the title of Primate.

Nineteen years later, on 31 January 1533, the diocese was elevated to archiepiscopal rank. For twenty-two years it was, geographically, the largest metropolitan ecclesiastical province in the world, having as suffragan dioceses: Azores, Brazil, Africa and Goa. The first (and only) Archbishop was D. Martinho of Portugal, also held the title of Primate.

Following the Portuguese Empire's economic and social progress new dioceses were created in 1534, whose areas were detached from the Diocese of Funchal: Goa, Angra, Santiago and São Tome, São Salvador da Bahia. Later, on January 31, 1533, the Diocese of Funchal was elevated to the category of metropolitan and primate. In 1551 Pope Julius III revoked the situation by passing Funchal to the simple suffrage bishopric of the Archdiocese of Lisbon, as it remains today.

The first bishop to visit the diocese was D. Ambrósio Brandão, in 1538, on behalf of the diocesan bishop D. Martinho of Portugal. After the death of D. Martinho de Portugal, the only archbishop of Funchal, the cathedral remained vacant until 1551. One year later, in 1552, Fr. Gaspar do Casal, who did not reside on the island, was appointed, and the most salient fact of his action was his participation in the Council of Trent. His successors, D. Jorge de Lemos, D. Jerónimo Barreto and D. Luís Figueiredo de Lemos, applied the Council and were the true workers of this reform.

The first bishop of Funchal to actually reside, full-time, after his appointment was D. Jorge de Lemos, in 1558.

Throughout its more than five centuries of history the diocese has only be headed by two Madeirans so far: D. Aires de Ornelas e Vasconcelos, who would then become Archbishop of Goa, and D. Teodoro de Faria.

Until the 20th century, the bishops of Funchal used the title of Bishop of Madeira, of Porto Santo, of Desertas and of Arguim. The seat of the Diocese of Funchal is the Cathedral of Our Lady of the Assumption.

On 8 March 2007, Pope Benedict XVI appointed António Carrilho (António III) as Bishop of Funchal, until then Auxiliary Bishop of Porto. Together with Cardinal Fernando Filoni,  António III, presided over the celebrations for the 500th anniversary of the foundation of the diocese on 17 May 2014.

The current bishop of Funchal is Nuno I, who took office on February 17, 2019.

Administrative divisions 
The diocese is currently organized into seven Archpriestships, which themselves are subdivided into a total of 96 parishes.

Choice of Patron Saint 
St. James the Less was chosen as Patron Saint of the Diocese time when Funchal faced various periods of plague in the 16th century.

In 1521, a severe plague spread throughout the city. Although local authorities, at the time, had sought to isolate the sick in order to control the plague outbreak, the efforts made seemed to be vain.

Gaspar Frutuoso, in his book Saudades da Terra accounts that "the city's Chapter and Senate resolved to choose by random ballot a patron saint among the Apostles... After having prayed before God,  a boy named John picked a note, where the name of James Minor was written, and they soon rejoiced all over the city."

Two years later, the civil authorities and the Dean of the Chapter met again in Funchal's Cathedral and confirmed the choice made of St. James Minor as their patron, with the commitment to celebrate him every year in his chapel with mass and procession in the Cathedral first day of May.

Schools 
The diocese directly runs one higher education institution, one theological school and several other schools on the Autonomous Region of Madeira.

Municipality of Funchal

Higher Education 

 Superior School for Nursing José de Cluny

Religious Education 

 Theological School of Funchal

Schools and High Schools 

 Arendrup School
 Complementary School of Til (APEL)
 Maria Eugénia de Canavial School
 Missionary School of the Sacred Heart of Jesus
 Presentation of Mary School
 Prince Henry, The Navigator School
 Princess Maria-Amélia School
 Saint John of the Brook School
 Saint Thérèse of the Child Jesus and  the Holy Face School
 Salesian School

Other Municipalities 
Schools and High Schools

 Saint Francis of Sales School - Calheta
 Saint Ana School - Machico
 Holy Family School - Santana
 Our Lady of the Conception School - Porto Santo Island
 Saint Constable School - Santa Cruz
 Saint Francis of Sales School - Santa Cruz

Culture

Sacred Art Museum of Funchal 
The Sacred Art Museum of Funchal, run by the diocese is housed in the former Episcopal Palace, founded by D. Luís Figueiredo de Lemos in 1594. The building was designed by Jerónimo Jorge, Master of Royal Works, who worked in the conception and design of defenses of the city of Funchal. From the primitive building, a section still survives, on the current square of the Municipality and Rua do Bispo. Mannerist sobriety is clearly visible in the northern arch or in the Chapel of Saint Louis of Toulosa, which has an inscription on the façade with the name of its founder, D. Luís de Figueiredo Lemos and dated 1600. D. António Teles da Silva, Bishop of Funchal, carried out new improvement works, between 1675-1682.

With the visit of the Ajuda Palace's Curator Manuel Cayola Zagallo, the diocese became more and more aware of the importance of the Flemish Art collection it owned and that was spread throughout the churches and chapels of its territory. With the unequivocal support from the diocese and the public entities of the time, the identified works were sent to be restore in Lisbon.

After important conservation and restoration work by Fernando Mardel, the paintings were exhibited in Lisbon at the National Museum of Ancient Art in 1949. They would later integrate the Funchal Museum of Sacred Art, inaugurated in 1955. To this set were added other works, especially of Goldsmithing, Ecclesiastic Garments and Sculpture, mostly from Portuguese workshops, which were, in many cases out of worship and in poor condition, in many churches of the diocese, and which became part of the Museum's collections. The Museum's collection include works attributed to painter such as Gerard David, Dieric Bouts, Joos Van Cleve, Jan Provoost and Pieter de Coeck Van Aelst.

Madeira Organ Festival 
Together with the Regional Government of Madeira the diocese promotes, by allowing its churches to act as concert venues, for the island's Organ Festival. This festival is usually organized in a set of twelve concerts, headlined by nationally and internationally renowned Master Organ players.

Media 
The diocese of Funchal runs a radio station (PEF - Posto Emissor de Rádio Difusão do Funchal), that broadcasts the news from Rádio Renascença, and an online newspaper (Jornal da Madeira).

List of Bishops of Funchal

Bishops do Funchal 
1. D. Diego Pinheiro Lobo (1514–1526)

Archbishop of Funchal 
2. D. Martinho de Portugal (1533–1547)

Bishops of Funchal 
3. D. Frei Gaspar (I) do Casal (1551–1556)
4. D. Frei Jorge de Lemos (1556–1569)
5. D. Frei de Távora (1569–1573)
6. D. Jerónimo (I) Barreto (1573–1585), appointed Bishop of Faro {Algarve}
7. D. Luís (I) de Figueiredo e Lemos (1585–1608)
8. D. Frei Lourenço de Távora (1610–1617), appointed Bishop of Elvas
9. D. Jerónimo (II) Fernando (1619–1650)
10. D. Frei Gabriel de Almeida (1670–1674)
11. D. Frei António (I) Teles da Silva (1674–1682)
12. D. Estêvão Brioso de Figueiredo (1683–1689)
13. D. Frei José (I) de Santa Maria (1690–1696), appointed Bishop of Porto
14. D. José (I) de Sousa Castelo Branco (1698–1725)
15. D. Frei Manuel (I) Coutinho (1725–1741), appointed Bishop of Lamego
16. D. Frei João (I) do Nascimento (1741–1753)
17. D. Gaspar (II) Afonso da Costa Brandão (1756–1784)
18. D. José (III) da Costa Torres (1784–1796), appointed Bishop of Elvas
19. D. Luís (II) Rodrigues Vilares (1796–1811)
20. D. João (II) Joaquim Bernardino de Brito (1817–1819)
21. D. Francisco (I) José Rodrigues de Andrade (1821–1838)
22. D. José (IV) Xavier de Cerveira e Sousa (1844–1849), appointed Bishop of Beija
23. D. Manuel (II) Martins Manso (1849–1858), appointed Bishop of Guarda
24. D. Patrício Xavier de Moura (1859–1872)
25. D. Aires de Ornelas e Vasconcelos (1872–1874), appointed Archbishop of Goa, India
26. D. Manuel (III) Agostinho Barreto (1876–1911)
27. D. António (II) Manuel Pereira Ribeiro (1914–1957)
28. D. Frei David de Sousa, OFM (1957–1965), appointed Archbishop of Évora
29. D. João (III) António da Silva Saraiva (1965–1972), appointed Bishop of Coimbra
30. D. Francisco (II) Antunes Santana (1974–1982)
31. D. Teodoro de Faria (1982–2007)
32. D. António (III) José Cavaco Carrilho (2007–2019)
33. D. Nuno Brás da Silva Martins (2019–present)

Other affiliated bishops

Coadjutor bishop
Aires de Ornelas de Vasconcelos (1871-1872)

Auxiliary bishop
Manuel de Jesus Pereira (1948-1953), appointed Auxiliary Bishop of Coimbra

Other priests of this diocese who became Cardinals
António Mendes Bello, appointed Archbishop (personal title), Auxiliary of Lisbon in 1884; future Cardinal
Teodosio Clemente de Gouveia, appointed Prelate of Mozambique in 1936; future Cardinal
José Tolentino de Mendonça, appointed Archbishop in 2018 (Cardinal in 2019)

Coat of Arms 
On March 23, 2019, the Diocese announced through its Facebook page and on a historical note on its website its coat of arms. The arms were designed by Miguel Pinto-Correia following the economist's open letter to the Bishop published in the regional newspaper, suggesting that the Diocese should adopt a coat of arms on 600th anniversary of the discovery of Madeira.

References

External links
 Diocese do Funchal – Catholic-Hierarchy
 Diocese do Funchal – GCatholic
 Cathedral of Our Lady of the Assumption – gcatholic
 Diocese do Funchal Catholic Encyclopedia

Organisations based in Madeira
Funchal
1514 establishments in Portugal
Religious organizations established in the 1510s
Funchal
Funchal, Roman Catholic Diocese of